Sing On! Spain is a 2020 reality television show streaming television series hosted by Ricky Merino.

Release 
Sing On! Spain was released on July 24, 2020, on Netflix.

References

External links
 
 

2020 Spanish television series debuts
Spanish-language Netflix original programming